is a Japanese manga creator from Shobara, Hiroshima, Japan.

He has stated in an interview that he was a member of his high school's track and field team and that he loves to watch baseball, both of which are emphasized in his hit manga Suzuka.

He debuted in 1996 with the one-shot HALF & HALF in Magazine Fresh. His first two hits, Suzuka and Cross Over, both mixed the genres of sports with high school romance. Suzuka focused on track and field while Cross Over used basketball.

He was an assistant to Tsukasa Ōshima, and respects Fujiko F. Fujio and Masahito Soda.

In 2009 he designed the High School Girl Kimchi for Hokubi Construction food company.

Works

Manga

 HALF & HALF (1996 Magazine Fresh; Kodansha)
  (2000–2001 Kodansha)
 Cross Over (2002–03 Weekly Shōnen Magazine; Kodansha)
  (2004–2007 Weekly Shōnen Magazine; Kodansha)
  (2007 Kodansha)
  (2005 Shōnen Magazine Wonder; Kodansha)
 HALF & HALF (2007 Magazine Special; Kodansha)
  (2007 Magazine Special; Kodansha)
  (2008–2014 Weekly Shōnen Magazine; Kodansha)
 Princess Lucia (2009–2015 Monthly Comic Blade; Mag Garden)
  (2010–2011 Bessatsu Shōnen Magazine; Kodansha)
 Half & half (2012–2016 Bessatsu Shōnen Magazine; Kodansha)
  (2014–2018 Weekly Shōnen Magazine; Kodansha)
 Hitman (2018–2021) Weekly Shōnen Magazine; Kodansha)
  (2021–present) Weekly Shōnen Magazine; Kodansha)

Video games

 Fire Emblem Heroes (2017) Lute artwork

References

External links
 

Manga artists from Hiroshima Prefecture
1974 births
Living people